Ready for You may refer to:

"Ready for You", a 2005 song by Kutless from Strong Tower
"Ready for You", a 2015 song by Years & Years from Communion
"Ready for You", a 2017 song by Haim from Something to Tell You
"Ready for Ya", a 2017 song by Demi Lovato from Tell Me You Love Me